The 2022–23 Penn Quakers men's basketball team represents the University of Pennsylvania in the 2022–23 NCAA Division I men's basketball season. The Quakers, led by seventh-year head coach Steve Donahue, play their home games at The Palestra in Philadelphia, Pennsylvania as members of the Ivy League.

Previous season
The Quakers finished the 2021–22 season 12–16, 9–5 in Ivy League play to finish in third place. As the No. 3 seed, they were defeated by No. 2 seed Yale in the semifinals of the Ivy League tournament.

Roster

Schedule and results

|-
!colspan=12 style=""|Regular season

|-
!colspan=12 style=""| Ivy League regular season

|-
!colspan=12 style=| Ivy League Tournament

Sources

References

Penn Quakers men's basketball seasons
Penn Quakers
Penn Quakers men's basketball
Penn Quakers men's basketball